The Papua New Guinea cricket team gained One Day International cricket (ODI) status in February 2014 after finishing in fourth place in the 2014 Cricket World Cup Qualifier. They played their first ODI match on 8 November 2014, against Hong Kong in Australia. They lost their ODI status in March 2018 after losing a playoff match against Nepal and finishing 9th in the 2018 Cricket World Cup Qualifier. Papua New Guinea regained ODI status on 26 April 2019, when they defeated Oman to secure a top-four finish in the 2019 ICC World Cricket League Division Two.

This list includes all players who have played at least one ODI match and is initially arranged in the order of debut appearance. Where more than one player won their first caps in alphabetical order at the time of debut.

Key

Players
Statistics are correct as of 15 March 2023.

See also
 Papua New Guinea T20I cricketers

Notes

References

Cricket in Papua New Guinea
ODI